Joseph Haydn wrote sixty-eight string quartets. (The number was previously thought to be eighty-three, but this includes some arrangements and spurious works.) They are usually referred to by their opus numbers, not Anthony van Hoboken's catalogue numbers or their publication order in the First Haydn Edition (FHE).

Opus 1 (1762–64)  
Quartet No. 1 in B major ("La Chasse"), Op. 1, No. 1, FHE No. 52, Hoboken No. III:1
Quartet No. 2 in E major, Op. 1, No. 2, FHE No. 53, Hoboken No. III:2
Quartet No. 3 in D major, Op. 1, No. 3, FHE No. 54, Hoboken No. III:3
Quartet No. 4 in G major, Op. 1, No. 4, FHE No. 55, Hoboken No. III:4
Quartet No. 5 in E major, Op. 1, No. 0, Hoboken No. II:6 (also referred to as Opus 0)
Quartet in B major, Op. 1, No. 5, FHE No. 56, Hoboken No. III:5 (later found to be the Symphony A, Hob. I/107)
Quartet No. 6 in C major, Op. 1, No. 6, FHE No. 57, Hoboken No. III:6

Opus 2 (1763–65)
The two quartets numbered 3 and 5 are spurious arrangements by an unknown hand.

Quartet No. 7 in A major, Op. 2, No. 1, FHE No. 58, Hoboken No. III:7
Quartet No. 8 in E major, Op. 2, No. 2, FHE No. 59, Hoboken No. III:8
Quartet in E major, Op. 2, No. 3, FHE No. 60 (arrangement of Cassation in E-flat major, Hob. II:21), Hoboken No. III:9
Quartet No. 9 in F major, Op. 2, No. 4, FHE No. 61, Hoboken No. III:10
Quartet in D major, Op. 2, No. 5, FHE No. 62 (arrangement of Cassation in D major, Hob. II:22), Hoboken No. III:11
Quartet No. 10 in B major, Op. 2, No. 6, FHE No. 63, Hoboken No. III:12

Opus 3 (spurious)

This set of quartets is now commonly attributed to Romanus Hoffstetter, though there is no universal agreement on this. According to the scholar Allan Badley, "The works were omitted from the Entwurf-Katalog, the running catalogue of his works he (Haydn) kept from 1765 until after the London visits, but found their way into the Haydn-Verzeichnis prepared in 1805 under the composer’s direct supervision by his faithful factotum Joseph Elssler. Haydn also accepted the six works as genuine in the edition of his complete string quartets published by Ignaz Pleyel. Unfortunately, both strands of evidence are not beyond questioning." Badley goes on to say "The meagre bibliographical evidence has been painstakingly sifted and the works themselves subjected to every kind of analytical technique known to musicology. Haydn’s authorship still remains doubtful but so too does that of Pater Romanus Hoffstetter the most commonly favoured alternative."

In the 1980s, Scott Fruehwald claimed to show that the quartets were not by Haydn, based on stylistic analysis.. He also concluded that only the first two quartets were by Hoffstetter.

Quartet in E major, Op. 3, No. 1, FHE No. 64 (spurious), Hoboken No. III:13
Quartet in C major, Op. 3, No. 2, FHE No. 65 (spurious), Hoboken No. III:14
Quartet in G major, Op. 3, No. 3, FHE No. 66 (spurious), Hoboken No. III:15
Quartet in B major, Op. 3, No. 4, FHE No. 67 (spurious), Hoboken No. III:16
Quartet in F major, Op. 3, No. 5, FHE No. 68 (spurious), Hoboken No. III:17
Quartet in A major, Op. 3, No. 6, FHE No. 69 (spurious), Hoboken No. III:18

Opus 9 (1769)

Quartet No. 11 in D minor, Op. 9, No. 4, FHE No. 16, Hoboken No. III:22
Quartet No. 12 in C major, Op. 9, No. 1, FHE No. 7, Hoboken No. III:19
Quartet No. 13 in G major, Op. 9, No. 3, FHE No. 9, Hoboken No. III:21
Quartet No. 14 in E major, Op. 9, No. 2, FHE No. 8, Hoboken No. III:20
Quartet No. 15 in B major, Op. 9, No. 5, FHE No. 17, Hoboken No. III:23
Quartet No. 16 in A major, Op. 9, No. 6, FHE No. 18, Hoboken No. III:24

Opus 17 (1771)
Quartet No. 17 in F major, Op. 17, No. 2, FHE No. 2, Hoboken No. III:26
 Moderato 
 Menuetto: Allegretto 
 Adagio 
 Finale: Allegro di molto 
Quartet No. 18 in E major, Op. 17, No. 1, FHE No. 1, Hoboken No. III:25
 Quartett in E-Dur, op. 17, Nr. 1, Hob. III:25
 Moderato 
 Menuetto: Allegretto 
 Adagio 
 Finale: Presto 
Quartet No. 19 in C minor, Op. 17, No. 4, FHE No. 4, Hoboken No. III:28
Quartet No. 20 in D major, Op. 17, No. 6, FHE No. 6, Hoboken No. III:30
Quartet No. 21 In E major, Op. 17, No. 3, FHE No. 3, Hoboken No. III:27
Quartet No. 22 in G major, Op. 17, No. 5, FHE No. 5, Hoboken No. III:29

Opus 20, the "Sun" quartets (1772)

The nickname "Sun" refers to the image of a rising sun on the cover page of the 1779 Hummel edition, the most widely-distributed at the time.

Quartet No. 23 in F minor, Op. 20, No. 5, FHE No. 47, Hoboken No. III:35
Quartet No. 24 in A major, Op. 20, No. 6, FHE No. 48, Hoboken No. III:36
Quartet No. 25 in C major, Op. 20, No. 2, FHE No. 44, Hoboken No. III:32
Quartet No. 26 in G minor, Op. 20, No. 3, FHE No. 45, Hoboken No. III:33
Quartet No. 27 in D major, Op. 20, No. 4, FHE No. 46, Hoboken No. III:34
Quartet No. 28 in E major, Op. 20, No. 1, FHE No. 43, Hoboken No. III:31

Opus 33, the "Russian" quartets (1781)

Quartet No. 29 in G major ("How Do You Do?"), Op. 33, No. 5, FHE No. 74, Hoboken No. III:41
Quartet No. 30 in E major ("The Joke"), Op. 33, No. 2, FHE No. 71, Hoboken No. III:38
Quartet No. 31 in B minor, Op. 33, No. 1, FHE No. 70, Hoboken No. III:37
Quartet No. 32 in C major ("The Bird"), Op. 33, No. 3, FHE No. 72, Hoboken No. III:39
Quartet No. 33 in D major, Op. 33, No. 6, FHE No. 75, Hoboken No. III:42
Quartet No. 34 in B major, Op. 33, No. 4, FHE No. 73, Hoboken No. III:40

Opus 42 (1785)
Quartet No. 35 in D minor, Op. 42, FHE No. 15, Hoboken No. III:43
 Andante ed innocentemente  
 Menuetto: Allegretto  
 Adagio e cantabile  
 Finale: Presto

Opus 50, the "Prussian" quartets (1787)

Quartet No. 36 in B major, Op. 50, No. 1, FHE No. 10, Hoboken No. III:44
Quartet No. 37 in C major, Op. 50, No. 2, FHE No. 11, Hoboken No. III:45
Quartet No. 38 in E major, Op. 50, No. 3, FHE No. 12, Hoboken No. III:46
Quartet No. 39 in F minor, Op. 50, No. 4, FHE No. 25, Hoboken No. III:47
Quartet No. 40 in F major ("Dream"), Op. 50, No. 5, FHE No. 26, Hoboken No. III:48
Quartet No. 41 in D major ("The Frog"), Op. 50, No. 6, FHE No. 27, Hoboken No. III:49

Opus 51 (1787)

The Seven Last Words of Our Savior on the Cross, Op. 51 (transcription of work written for orchestra), Hob. No. III:50–56

Opus 54, 55, the "Tost" quartets, sets I & II (1788)
Named after Johann Tost, a violinist in the Esterhazy orchestra from 1783–89.
Quartet No. 42 in C major, Op. 54, No. 2, FHE No. 20, Hoboken No. III:57
 Vivace  
 Adagio  
 Menuetto: Allegretto  
 Finale: Adagio – Presto – Adagio  
Quartet No. 43 in G major, Op. 54, No. 1, FHE No. 19, Hoboken No. III:58
 Allegro con brio  
 Allegretto  
 Menuetto: Allegretto  
 Finale: Presto  
Quartet No. 44 in E major, Op. 54, No. 3, FHE No. 21, Hoboken No. III:59
 Allegro  
 Largo cantabile  
 Menuetto: Allegretto  
 Finale: Presto  
Quartet No. 45 in A major, Op. 55, No. 1, FHE No. 22, Hoboken No. III:60
 Allegro  
 Adagio cantabile  
 Menuetto  
 Finale: Vivace  
Quartet No. 46 in F minor ("Razor"), Op. 55, No. 2, FHE No. 23, Hoboken No. III:61
 Andante o più tosto allegretto  
 Allegro  
 Menuetto: Allegretto  
 Finale: Presto  
Quartet No. 47 in B major, Op. 55, No. 3, FHE No. 24, Hoboken No. III:62
 Vivace assai  
 Adagio ma non troppo  
 Menuetto  
 Finale: Presto

Opus 64, the "Tost" quartets, set III (1790)

Quartet No. 48 in C major, Op. 64, No. 1, FHE No. 31, Hoboken No. III:65
Quartet No. 49 in B minor, Op. 64, No. 2, FHE No. 32, Hoboken No. III:68
Quartet No. 50 in B major, Op. 64, No. 3, FHE No. 33, Hoboken No. III:67
Quartet No. 51 in G major, Op. 64, No. 4, FHE No. 34, Hoboken No. III:66
Quartet No. 52 in E major, Op. 64, No. 6, FHE No. 36, Hoboken No. III:64
Quartet No. 53 in D major ("The Lark"), Op. 64, No. 5, FHE No. 35, Hoboken No. III:63

Opus 71, 74, the "Apponyi" quartets (1793) 

Count Anton Georg Apponyi, a relative of Haydn’s patrons, paid 100 ducats for the privilege of having these quartets publicly dedicated to him.

Quartet No. 54 in B major, Op. 71, No. 1, FHE No. 37, Hoboken No. III:69
 Allegro  
 Adagio  
 Menuetto: Allegretto  
 (Finale): Vivace  
Quartet No. 55 in D major, Op. 71, No. 2, FHE No. 38, Hoboken No. III:70
 Adagio – Allegro  
 Adagio (cantabile)  
 Menuetto: Allegretto  
 Finale: Allegretto  
Quartet No. 56 in E major, Op. 71, No. 3, FHE No. 39, Hoboken No. III:71
 Vivace  
 Andante con moto  
 Menuetto  
 Finale: Vivace  
Quartet No. 57 in C major, Op. 74, No. 1, FHE No. 28, Hoboken No. III:72
 Allegro (moderato)  
 Andantino (grazioso)  
 Menuetto: Allegro  
 Finale: Vivace  
Quartet No. 58 in F major, Op. 74, No. 2, FHE No. 29, Hoboken No. III:73
 Allegro spiritoso  
 Andante grazioso  
 Menuetto  
 Finale: Presto  
Quartet No. 59 in G minor ("Rider"), Op. 74, No. 3, FHE No. 30, Hoboken No. III:74
 Allegro  
 Largo assai  
 Menuetto: (Allegretto)  
 Finale: Allegro con brio

Opus 76, the "Erdödy" quartets (1797)

Quartet No. 60 in G major ("Jack-in-the-box"), Op. 76, No. 1, FHE No. 40, Hoboken No. III:75
Quartet No. 61 in D minor ("Quinten", "Fifths", "The Donkey"), Op. 76, No. 2, FHE No. 41, Hoboken No. III:76
Quartet No. 62 in C major ("Emperor" or "Kaiser"), Op. 76, No. 3, FHE No. 42, Hoboken No. III:77
Quartet No. 63 in B major ("Sunrise"), Op. 76, No. 4, FHE No. 49, Hoboken No. III:78
Quartet No. 64 in D major ("Largo" or "Friedhofsquartett"), Op. 76, No. 5, FHE No. 50, Hoboken No. III:79
Quartet No. 65 in E major, Op. 76, No. 6, FHE No. 51, Hoboken No. III:80

Opus 77, the "Lobkowitz" quartets (1799)
Quartet No. 66 in G major, Op. 77, No. 1, FHE No. 13, Hoboken No. III:81
 Allegro moderato 
 Adagio 
 Menuetto: Presto 
 Finale: Presto 
Quartet No. 67 in F major, Op. 77, No. 2, FHE No. 14, Hoboken No. III:82
 Allegro moderato 
 Menuet: Presto 
 Andante 
 Finale: Vivace assai

Opus 103 (1803)
Quartet No. 68 in D minor, Op. 103, Hoboken No. III:83 (incomplete); in 2013, Haydn specialist William Drabkin composed a completion of Haydn's unfinished final quartet.
 Andante grazioso 
 Menuetto ma non troppo presto

List by keys

Recordings of complete cycles

Multiple recordings of Haydn's complete string quartets have been made over the years. During the 1970s, the Aeolian Quartet recorded a complete cycle for Decca, which was then reissued in 2009. From 1994 to 1999, the Angeles Quartet recorded a cycle for Philips Records, which received critical reviews. During the 1990s, the Tátrai Quartet completed a cycle for Hungaroton. From 1989 to 2003, the Kodály Quartet recorded a cycle for Naxos Records, which is still considered by many musicologists and critics as the best cycle on the market. More recently, from 2002 to 2008, the Buchberger Quartet recorded a cycle for Brilliant Classics on period instruments.

References

 
String quartets
Haydn